This is the discography of French DJ Tchami.

Albums

Extended plays

Singles

Guest appearances

Remixes

Productions credits

Music videos 

 2015 : Tchami  - "After Life"
 2017 : Tchami  - "World To Me"
 2020 : Tchami  - "Praise"

References

Discographies of French artists